The Shivering Truth is an American adult stop-motion animated anthology horror comedy television series created by Vernon Chatman and directed by Chatman and Cat Solen. The show is produced by Solen with PFFR and ShadowMachine, and features a wide range of voice talents besides Chatman, including Janeane Garofalo, Jonah Hill, Trey Parker, David Cross, Jordan Peele, Kyle Mooney, Julia Davis, Tierra Whack, Will Forte, and Josh Gad, amongst others. The Shivering Truth premiered on December 10, 2018 on Adult Swim, with the pilot episode having been released online on May 22, 2018 on the Adult Swim website.

In November 2019, Adult Swim renewed the series for a second season, which premiered on May 10, 2020.

Style and content
When announced in a press release by Adult Swim in May 2017, The Shivering Truth was described as "a delicately crafted, darkly surreal anthology comedy, a miniature propulsive omnibus cluster bomb of painfully riotous daymares all dripping with the orange goo of dream logic. A series of loosely-linked emotional parables about stories within tales that crawled out of the deepest caverns of your unconscious mind and became lovingly animated in breath-slapping stop motion – in other words, it is the TRUTH".

The characters in the show are  puppets with wire-based armatures, created with silicone, wool, polystyrene, and resin. Chatman stated that around six months of physical production, a month of recording, and  months of post-production were needed to complete six episodes. Chatman has noted several inspirations for his work on the show, including Terry Gilliam's work on Monty Python's Flying Circus, stating that "I saw it when I was very young, so it scared me. I didn't know when the animation was beginning or ending." He also explained that "A lot of my influences are non-animated, primarily in short films, novels, even radio shows. A recent one is David Eagleman's books on the brain. He's a neuroscientist and he gives you 40 different versions of the afterlife, and none of them can co-exist." Solen has spoken on her inspirations as well, saying that "I loved the movie The Wizard of Speed and Time, which is a cautionary tale about making movies. Another film that I loved as a kid was Nicolas Roeg's [film] adaptation of Roald Dahl's The Witches, which featured both Anjelica Huston and Jim Henson's puppets. It scared me so much!"

Cast

Season 1

Season 2

Music
The song played during the closing credits is usually some version of the old English ballad Long Lankin. The music is often distorted in some way and usually begins near the end of the ballad, at the lines "There's blood in the kitchen, there's blood in the hall / There's blood in the parlour where my lady did fall." The original score is by Heather Christian.

Episodes

Series overview

Pilot (2018)

Season 1 (2018)

Season 2 (2020)

Release
The pilot episode premiered on the Adult Swim website on May 22, 2018. Before the television premiere on December 10, 2018, Adult Swim created an "online scavenger hunt" by releasing all six episodes on multiple websites and platforms.

In June 2020, the series was uploaded to subscription video on demand streaming service HBO Max, with the exception of the episode "Ogled Inklings", which was intentionally excluded due to a scene where a woman gives birth to a child wearing a peaked policeman's cap, whom the doctor refers to as "a dirty pig". This ban took place due to the then-ongoing George Floyd protests and rising prominence of the Black Lives Matter movement, with an Adult Swim representative stating that "When Adult Swim transitions series to a new platform we determine what episodes are selected through creative and cultural filters and our standards and practices policies. Oftentimes these decisions are made in collaboration with the show’s creator”. Similar action was also taken against episodes of The Boondocks and an episode of Aqua Teen Hunger Force.

Reception
Daniel Kurland of Den of Geek praised the pilot along with the subsequent first episodes to premiere, giving the show a score of 5/5 and calling it "straight up one of the best things that I’ve ever seen in my life". Jonathan Barkan of Dread Central called the show "pure nightmare fuel genius", writing that it "looks like the cast aside baby of Charlie Kaufman and Wes Anderson ... it's packed full of absurdist humor, the kind of stuff that you will watch and not be sure if you should laugh, wince, or look at your friends and ask, 'What the fuck?'" Dave Trumbore of Collider wrote that "It’s not often you get to put this level of artistry and insanity on display on an international television network", and that "You’ll definitely laugh while watching The Shivering Truth, but there’s just as good a chance that you’ll throw up a bit, too".

See also 
 Jam (TV series), a similar comedy-horror sketch series
 Anomalisa

References

Notes

External links

2010s American adult animated television series
2010s American anthology television series
2010s American black comedy television series
2010s American horror comedy television series
2010s American sketch comedy television series
2010s American surreal comedy television series
2020s American adult animated television series
2020s American anthology television series
2020s American black comedy television series
2020s American horror comedy television series
2020s American sketch comedy television series
2020s American surreal comedy television series
2018 American television series debuts
2020 American television series endings
Adult Swim original programming
American adult animated comedy television series
American adult animated fantasy television series
American adult animated horror television series
American adult animation anthology series
American stop-motion adult animated television series
American surreal comedy television series
American television shows featuring puppetry
English-language television shows
Television series by PFFR
Television series by ShadowMachine
Television series by Williams Street